Monterey is a city located in Monterey County on the southern edge of Monterey Bay on the U.S. state of California's Central Coast. Founded on June 3, 1770, it functioned as the capital of Alta California under both Spain (1804–1821) and Mexico (1822–1846). During this period, Monterey hosted California's first theater, public building, public library, publicly funded school, printing-press, and newspaper. It was originally the only port of entry for all taxable goods in California. In 1846, during the Mexican–American War of 1846–1848, the United States Flag was raised over the Customs House. After Mexico ceded California to the U.S. at the end of the war, Monterey hosted California's first constitutional convention in 1849.
 
The 2020 census recorded a population of 30,218.

Monterey and the surrounding area have attracted artists since the late 19th-century, and many celebrated painters and writers have lived in the area. Until the 1950s there was an abundant fishery. Monterey's present-day attractions include the Monterey Bay Aquarium, Cannery Row, Fisherman's Wharf, California Roots Music and Arts Festival, and the annual Monterey Jazz Festival.

History

Ohlone period 

Long before the arrival of Spanish explorers, the Rumsen Ohlone tribe, one of seven linguistically distinct Ohlone groups in California, inhabited the area now known as Monterey. They subsisted by hunting, fishing and gathering food on and around the biologically rich Monterey Peninsula. Researchers have found a number of shell middens in the area and, based on the archaeological evidence, concluded the Ohlone's primary marine food consisted at various times of mussels and abalone.

Spanish period 

The city is named after Monterey Bay. The current bay's name was given by Sebastián Vizcaíno in 1602. He anchored in what is now the Monterey harbor on December 16, and named it Puerto de Monterrey, in honor of the Conde de Monterrey, who was then the viceroy of New Spain. Monterrey is an alternate spelling of Monterrei, a municipality in the Galicia region of Spain from which the viceroy and his father (the Fourth Count of Monterrei) originated. Some variants of the city's name are recorded as Monte Rey and Monterey. Monterey Bay had been described earlier by Juan Rodríguez Cabrillo, but he had given it a different name. Despite the explorations of Cabrillo and Vizcaino, and despite Spain's frequent trading voyages between Asia and Mexico, the Spanish did not make Monterey Bay into a settled permanent harbor before the eighteenth century because it was too exposed to rough ocean currents and winds.

Despite Monterey's limited use as a maritime port, the encroachments of other Europeans near California in the eighteenth century prompted the Spanish monarchy to try to better secure the region. As a result, it commissioned the Portola exploration and Alta California mission system. In 1769, the first European land exploration of Alta California, the Spanish Portolá expedition, traveled north from San Diego. They sought Vizcaíno's Port of Monterey, which he had described as "a fine harbor sheltered from all winds" 167 years earlier. The explorers failed to recognize the place when they came to it on October 1, 1769. The party continued north as far as San Francisco Bay before turning back. On the return journey, they camped near one of Monterey's lagoons on November 27, still not convinced they had found the place Vizcaíno had described. Franciscan missionary Juan Crespí noted in his diary, "We halted in sight of the Point of Pines (recognized, as was said, in the beginning of October) and camped near a small lagoon which has rather muddy water, but abounds in pasture and firewood."
Gaspar de Portolá returned by land to Monterey the next year, having concluded that he must have been at Vizcaíno's Port of Monterey after all. The land party was met at Monterey by Junípero Serra, who traveled by sea. Portolá erected the Presidio of Monterey to defend the port and, on June 3, 1770, Serra founded the Cathedral of San Carlos Borromeo inside the presidio enclosure. Portolá returned to Mexico, replaced in Monterey by Captain Pedro Fages, who had been third in command on the exploratory expeditions. Fages became the second governor of Alta California, serving from 1770 to 1774. San Diego is the only city in California older than Monterey.

Serra's missionary aims soon came into conflict with Fages and the soldiers, so he relocated and built a new mission in Carmel the following year to gain greater independence from Fages. The existing wood and adobe church remained in service to the nearby soldiers and became the Royal Presidio Chapel.

Monterey became the capital of the "Province of Both Californias" in 1777, and the chapel was renamed the Royal Presidio Chapel. The original church was destroyed by fire in 1789 and replaced by the present sandstone structure. It was completed in 1794 by Indian labor. In 1840, the chapel was rededicated to the patronage of Saint Charles Borromeo. The cathedral is the oldest continuously operating parish and the oldest stone building in California. It is also the oldest (and smallest) serving cathedral along with St. Louis Cathedral in New Orleans, Louisiana. It is the only existing presidio chapel in California and the only surviving building from the original Monterey Presidio.

The city was originally the only port of entry for all taxable goods in California. All shipments into California by sea were required to go through the Custom House, the oldest governmental building in the state and California's Historic Landmark Number One. Built in three phases, the Spanish began construction of the Custom House in 1814, the Mexican government completed the center section in 1827, and the United States government finished the lower end in 1846.

The fort's resistance proved ineffective, and after an hour of combat the Argentine flag flew over it. The Argentines took the city for six days, during which time they stole the cattle and burned the fort, the artillery headquarters, the governor's residence and the Spanish houses. The town's residents were unharmed.

Mexican period 

Mexico gained independence from Spain in 1821, but the civil and religious institutions of Alta California remained much the same until the 1830s, when the secularization of the missions converted most of the mission pasture lands into private land grant ranchos. In 1834, the San Carlos Cemetery was officially opened and interred many of the early local families.

Monterey was the site of the Battle of Monterey on July 7, 1846, during the Mexican–American War. It was on this date that John D. Sloat, Commodore in the United States Navy, raised the U.S. flag over the Monterey Custom House and claimed California for the United States.

In addition, many historic "firsts" occurred in Monterey. These include California's first theater, brick house, publicly funded school, public building, public library, and printing press (which printed The Californian, California's first newspaper.) Larkin House, one of Monterey State Historic Park's National Historic Landmarks, built in the Mexican period by Thomas Oliver Larkin, is an early example of Monterey Colonial architecture. The Old Custom House, the historic district and the Royal Presidio Chapel are also National Historic Landmarks. The Cooper-Molera Adobe is a National Trust Historic Site.

American period 

Colton Hall, built in 1849 by Walter Colton, originally served as both a public school and a government meeting place.

Monterey hosted California's first constitutional convention in 1849, which composed the documents necessary to apply to the United States for statehood. Today it houses a small museum, while adjacent buildings serve as the seat of local government, and the Monterey post office (opened in 1849). Monterey was incorporated in 1890.

Thomas Albert Work built several of the buildings in Monterey including the three-story Del Mar hotel in 1895, at the corner of Sixteenth, and in 1900, bought into the First National Bank in Monterey, acquiring it in 1906. He was president of the bank for more than twenty years.

Monterey had long been famous for the abundant fishery in Monterey Bay. That changed in the 1950s when the local fishery business collapsed due to overfishing. A few of the old fishermen's cabins from the early 20th century have been preserved as they originally stood along Cannery Row.

The city has a noteworthy history as a center for California painters in the late 19th and early 20th centuries. Such painters as Arthur Frank Mathews, Armin Hansen, Xavier Martinez, Rowena Meeks Abdy and Percy Gray lived or visited to pursue painting in the style of either En plein air or Tonalism.

In addition to painters, many noted authors have also lived in and around the Monterey area, including Robert Louis Stevenson, John Steinbeck, Ed Ricketts, Robinson Jeffers, Robert A. Heinlein, and Henry Miller.

More recently, Monterey has been recognized for its significant involvement in post-secondary learning of languages other than English and its major role in delivering translation and interpretation services around the world. In November 1995, California Governor Pete Wilson proclaimed Monterey as "the Language Capital of the World".

On June 7, 2021, the new macOS Monterey operating system was presented at Apple's Worldwide Developers Conference (WWDC2021) and named after the Monterey region.

Geography 

Sand deposits in the northern coastal area comprise the sole known mineral resources. The city has several distinct districts, such as New Monterey, Del Monte, and Cannery Row.

Local soil is Quaternary Alluvium. Common soil series include the Baywood fine sand on the east side, Narlon loamy sand on the west side, Sheridan coarse sandy loam on hilly terrain, and the pale Tangair sand on hills supporting closed-cone pine habitat. The Monterey Bay fault, which tracks  to the north, is also active, as is the Palo Colorado fault  to the south. Also nearby, minor but potentially active, are the Berwick Canyon, Seaside, Tularcitos and Chupines faults.

The considerable undeveloped area in the northwest part of the city has a high potential for landslides and erosion.

The city is adjacent to the Monterey Bay National Marine Sanctuary, a federally protected ocean area extending  along the coast. Sometimes this sanctuary is confused with the local bay which is also termed Monterey Bay.

Soquel Canyon State Marine Conservation Area, Portuguese Ledge State Marine Conservation Area, Pacific Grove Marine Gardens State Marine Conservation Area, Lovers Point State Marine Reserve, Edward F. Ricketts State Marine Conservation Area and Asilomar State Marine Reserve are marine protected areas established by the state of California in Monterey Bay. Like underwater parks, these marine protected areas help conserve ocean wildlife and marine ecosystems.

The California sea otter, a threatened subspecies, inhabits the local Monterey Bay marine environment, and a field station of The Marine Mammal Center is located in Monterey to support sea rescue operations in this section of the California coast. The rare San Joaquin kit fox is found in Monterey's oak-forest and chaparral habitats. The chaparral, found mainly on the city's drier eastern slopes, hosts such plants as manzanita, chamise and ceanothus. Additional species of interest (that is, potential candidates for endangered species status) are the Salinas kangaroo rat and the silver-sided legless lizard.

There is a variety of natural habitat in Monterey: littoral zone and sand dunes; closed-cone pine forest; and Monterey Cypress. There are no dairy farms in the city of Monterey; the semi-hard cheese known as Monterey Jack originated in nearby Carmel Valley, California, and is named after businessman and land speculator David Jacks.

The closed-cone pine habitat is dominated by Monterey pine, Knobcone pine and Bishop pine, and contains the rare Monterey manzanita. In the early 20th century the botanist Willis Linn Jepson characterized Monterey Peninsula's forests as the "most important silva ever", and encouraged Samuel F.B. Morse (a century younger than the inventor Samuel F. B. Morse) of the Del Monte Properties Company to explore the possibilities of preserving the unique forest communities. The dune area is no less important, as it hosts endangered species such as the vascular plants Seaside birds beak, Hickman's potentilla and Eastwood's Ericameria. Rare plants also inhabit the chaparral: Hickman's onion, Yadon's piperia (Piperia yadonii) and Sandmat manzanita. Other rare plants in Monterey include Hutchinson's delphinium, Tidestrom lupine, Gardner's yampah and Knotweed, the latter perhaps already extinct.

Monterey's noise pollution has been mapped to define the principal sources of noise and to ascertain the areas of the population exposed to significant levels. Principal sources are the Monterey Regional Airport, State Route 1 and major arterial streets such as Munras Avenue, Fremont Street, Del Monte Boulevard, and Camino Aguajito. While most of Monterey is a quiet residential city, a moderate number of people in the northern part of the city are exposed to aircraft noise at levels in excess of 60 dB on the Community Noise Equivalent Level (CNEL) scale. The most intense source is State Route 1: all residents exposed to levels greater than 65 CNEL—about 1,600 people—live near State Route 1 or one of the principal arterial streets.

Climate 
The climate of Monterey is regulated by its proximity to the Pacific Ocean resulting in a cool-summer Mediterranean climate (Köppen climate classification: Csb) and closely resembles that of an oceanic climate. There is an average of 72.1 days with measurable precipitation annually. Summers in Monterey are often cool and foggy. The cold surface waters cause even summer nights to be unusually cool for the latitude, opposite to on the U.S. east coast where coastal summer days and nights are much warmer. The extreme moderation is further underlined by the fact that Monterey is on a similar latitude in California as Death Valley – one of the hottest areas in the world.

During winter, snow occasionally falls in the higher elevations of the Santa Lucia Mountains and Gabilan Mountains that overlook Monterey, but snow in Monterey itself is extremely rare. A few unusual events in January 1962, February 1976, and December 1997 brought a light coating of snow to Monterey. In March 2006, a total of  fell in Monterey, including  on March 10, 2006.

Annually, there are an average of 1.3 days with highs that reach or exceed  and an average of 1.5 days with lows at or below the freezing mark.

Demographics

2020
The 2020 United States Census reported that Monterey had a population of 30,218 people, with 12,912 households. The racial makeup of Monterey was 71.9% White, 3.7% African American, 0.9% Native American, 7.3% Asian, 0.3% Pacific Islander, and 7.9% from two or more races. Hispanics or Latinos of any race made up 19.0% of the population.

2010 

The 2010 United States Census reported that Monterey had a population of 27,810. The racial makeup of Monterey was 21,788 (78.3%) White, 777 (2.8%) African American, 149 (0.5%) Native American, 2,204 (7.9%) Asian, 91 (0.3%) Pacific Islander, 1,382 (5.0%) from other races, and 1,419 (5.1%) from two or more races. There were 3,817 people (13.7%) of Hispanic or Latino origin, of any race.

The Census reported that 25,307 people (91.0% of the population) lived in households, 2,210 (7.9%) lived in non-institutionalized group quarters, and 293 (1.1%) were institutionalized.

There were 12,184 households, out of which 2,475 (20.3%) had children under the age of 18 living in them, 4,690 (38.5%) were opposite-sex married couples living together, 902 (7.4%) had a female householder with no husband present, 371 (3.0%) had a male householder with no wife present. 4,778 households (39.2%) were made up of individuals, and 1,432 (11.8%) had someone living alone who was 65 years of age or older. The average household size was 2.08. There were 5,963 families (48.9% of all households); the average family size was 2.81.

The population was spread out, with 4,266 people (15.3%) under the age of 18, 3,841 people (13.8%) aged 18 to 24, 8,474 people (30.5%) aged 25 to 44, 6,932 people (24.9%) aged 45 to 64, and 4,297 people (15.5%) who were 65 years of age or older. The median age was 36.9 years. For every 100 females, there were 101.2 males. For every 100 females age 18 and over, there were 100.6 males.

The homeowner vacancy rate was 2.0%; the rental vacancy rate was 6.5%. 9,458 people (34.0% of the population) lived in owner-occupied housing units and 15,849 people (57.0%) lived in rental housing units.

2000 
As of the census of 2000, there were 29,674 people, 12,600 households, and 6,476 families residing in the city. The racial makeup of the city was 80.8% White, 10.9% Hispanic, 7.4% Asian, 2.5% African American, 0.6% Native American, 0.3% Pacific Islander, 3.9% from other races, and 4.5% from two or more races.

There were 12,600 households, out of which 21.8% had children under the age of 18 living with them, 39.5% were married couples living together, 8.4% had a female householder with no husband present, and 48.6% were non-families. 37.0% of all households consisted of individuals, and 11.0% had a lone dweller who is over 64. The average household size was 2.13 and the average family size was 2.82.

The age distribution is as follows: 16.6% under the age of 18, 13.1% from 18 to 24, 33.8% from 25 to 44, 21.7% from 45 to 64, and 14.9% who were 65 years of age or older. The median age was 36 years. For every 100 females, there were 96.8 males. For every 100 females age 18 and over, there were 96.1 males.

The median income for a household in the city was $49,109, and the median income for a family was $58,757. Males had a median income of $40,410 versus $31,258 for females. The per capita income for the city was $27,133. About 4.4% of families and 7.8% of the population were below the poverty line, including 6.5% of those under age 18 and 4.8% of those age 65 or over.

Neighborhoods
The official neighborhoods of Monterey west of Lake El Estero are Downtown, Old Town (also known as Spaghetti Hill by locals), New Monterey(which is where Cannery Row is located in), Monterey Vista, Skyline Forest, Alta Mesa, and Glenwood. East of Lake El Estero is Oak Grove, Aguajito Oaks, Del Monte Beach, Villa Del Monte, Cassanova Oak Knoll, Fisherman Flats, Deer Flats, Del Monte Grove or Laguna Grande, and La Mesa Village.

Economy

According to the city's 2015 Comprehensive Annual Financial Report, the top private-sector employers in the city are (in alphabetical order):

The top public-sector employers are (in alphabetical order):

Other private-sector employers based in Monterey include Monterey Peninsula Unified School District, and Mapleton Communications. Additional military facilities in Monterey include the Fleet Numerical Meteorology and Oceanography Center, and the United States Naval Research Laboratory – Monterey.

Arts and culture

Visual arts 
Monterey is the home of the Monterey Museum of Art, its annex museum La Mirada and the Salvador Dalí Museum. There are several commercial galleries located in the historic district of Cannery Row, New Monterey and Customs House Plaza.

Monterey is also the site of numerous waterfront arts and crafts festivals held in the Custom House Plaza at the top of Fisherman's Wharf.

Literary arts 
Steinbeck's friends included some of the city's more colorful characters, among them Ed Ricketts, a marine biologist, and Bruce Ariss, artist and theater enthusiast who designed and built the Wharf Theater.

After Ricketts' death, the new owner of his lab and a group of friends assembled each Wednesday at the lab for drinks and jazz music. While visiting with the group, San Francisco disc jockey Jimmy Lyons suggested holding a jazz celebration in Monterey, which eventually became the Monterey Jazz Festival.

In 1879, Robert Louis Stevenson spent a short time in Monterey at the French Hotel while writing The Amateur Emigrant, "The Old Pacific Capital," and "Vendetta of the West."  The former hotel, now known as the "Stevenson House", stands at 530 Houston Street and features items that belonged to the writer.

Music 
The Monterey Jazz Festival began in 1958, presenting such artists as Louis Armstrong, Dizzy Gillespie, and Billie Holiday, and now claims to be "the longest running jazz festival in the world" (the Newport Jazz Festival was established in 1954, but has changed venues since its founding).

In June 1967 the city was the venue of the Monterey Pop Festival. Formally known as the Monterey International Pop Music Festival the three-day concert event was held June 16 to 18, 1967, at the Monterey County Fairgrounds. It was the first widely promoted and heavily attended rock festival, attracting an estimated 200,000 total attendees with 55,000 to 90,000 people present at the event's peak at midnight on Sunday. It was notable as hosting the first major American appearances by Jimi Hendrix and The Who, as well as the first major public performances of Janis Joplin and Otis Redding.

The Monterey Pop Festival embodied the themes of San Francisco as a focal point for the counterculture and is generally regarded as one of the beginnings of the "Summer of Love" in 1967. It also became the template for future music festivals, notably the Woodstock Festival two years later.

In 1986, the Monterey Blues Festival was created and ran continuously for over two decades. It filed for bankruptcy in 2012 and was resurrected in 2017 as the Monterey International Blues Festival.

Theatre arts 

The building in which the first paid public dramatic entertainment in California occurred is located in Monterey and is called, appropriately, "California's First Theater". In 1847, a sailor named Jack Swan began construction on an adobe building at the corner of Pacific St. and Scott Ave, near the Pacific House and Fisherman's Wharf. Between 1847 and 1848 several detachments of soldiers were stationed in Monterey and some of the sailors approached Swan with a proposition to lease a section of his building for use as a theater and money-making venture—a proposal that Swan accepted. The enterprise collected $500 on its first performance, a considerable sum at that time. The primary mediums presented were melodramas and Olios (a form of musical revue and audience sing-along). In the spring of 1848, the play Putnam, the Iron Son of '76, was presented. After the California Gold Rush of 1849, much of the population, including Swan, traveled to northern California in search of riches. As a result, by the end that year, the company disbanded. In 1896, Swan died and the building was abandoned until 1906 when it was purchased by the California Historic Landmarks League, who deeded it to the State of California.
In 1937, the building was leased to Denny-Watrous Management, who revived the tradition of melodrama at the now historic building. A resident company was created and named the Troupers of the Gold Coast, who maintained the tradition for over 50 years, closing for renovation in 1999. It is now permanently closed.

The Wharf Theater opened on Fisherman's Wharf on May 18, 1950, with a production of Happy Birthday, featuring a set designed by Bruce Ariss. The theater also produced one of Bruce Ariss' original plays and was successful enough to draw the attention of MGM who brought the artist to Hollywood to work for several years. The theater was destroyed by fire on December 31, 1959. The company re-opened in 1960 in a new location on Alvarado Street (formerly "The Monterey Theater") which in 1963 was renamed "The Old Monterey Opera House". It continued until the mid-1960s when it fell to urban renewal. In the early 1970s, discussions began about rebuilding back on the wharf itself, and theater plans began to take shape. Bruce Ariss and Angelo Di Girolamo, whose brother had the original idea for a theater on the wharf, began construction on The New Wharf Theater in 1975. Designed by Ariss, the New Wharf Theater opened its doors on December 3, 1976, with a community theater production of Guys and Dolls, directed by Monterey Peninsula College Drama Department chairman, Morgan Stock. Located at the northwest end of old Fisherman's Wharf, the theater is now known as the Bruce Ariss Wharf Theater. Girolamo died in September 2014.

In 2005, the Golden State Theatre, a former movie palace located on Alvarado Street was refurbished to produce live theatrical events. The Forest Theater Guild produced several plays at the Golden State including: Aida, Grease, Zoot Suit, and Fiddler on the Roof. The theater's new owners, Eric and Lori Lochtefeld, have produced several musicals in the theater in conjunction with Broadway By the Bay.

Attractions 

Monterey is well known for the abundance and diversity of its marine life, which includes sea lions, sea otters, harbor seals, bat rays, kelp forests, pelicans and dolphins and several species of whales. Only a few miles offshore is the Monterey Canyon, the largest and deepest (at ) underwater canyon off the Pacific coast of North America, which grants scientists access to the deep sea within hours. The cornucopia of marine life makes Monterey a popular destination for scuba divers of all abilities ranging from novice to expert. Scuba classes are held at San Carlos State Beach, which has been a favorite with divers since the 1960s. The Monterey Bay Aquarium on Cannery Row is one of the largest aquariums in North America, and several marine science laboratories, including Hopkins Marine Station are located in the area.

Monterey's historic Fisherman's Wharf was constructed in 1845, reconstructed in 1870 and is now a commercial shopping and restaurant district with several whale-watching entities operating at the end of its pier.

Monterey is home to several museums and more than thirty carefully preserved historic buildings. Most of these buildings are adobes built in the mid-1800s. Some are museums and open to the public, including the Cooper Molera Adobe, Robert Louis Stevenson House, Casa Serrano, The Perry House, The Customs House, Colton Hall, Mayo Hayes O'Donnell Library and The First Brick House.  Many others are only open during Monterey's annual adobe tour. The Monterey Museum of Art specializes in Early California Impressionist painting, photography, and contemporary art. Other youth-oriented art attractions include MY Museum, a children's museum, and YAC, an arts organization for teens.

What may be the only whalebone sidewalk still in existence in the United States lies in front of the Old Whaling Station, left by New England whalers while California was still part of New Spain.

Cannery Row is a historic industrial district west of downtown Monterey. Several companies operated large sardine canneries and packing houses from the 1920s until the 1950s when the sardines were overfished and the industry collapsed. The neighborhood was a minor tourist attraction until the late 1980s when the Monterey Bay Aquarium bought the former Hovden Cannery and built their aquarium around it. The Aquarium revitalized the neighborhood and it is now the number one tourist destination on the Monterey Peninsula. It is home to more than 600 species of plants and animals. Several of the canneries burnt down in the 1970s and some of their empty foundations are still visible along the oceanfront. A free heritage trolley transports visitors between downtown Monterey and the Aquarium during the summer.

Once called Ocean View Boulevard, the street was renamed Cannery Row in 1953 in honor of writer John Steinbeck, who had written a well-known novel of the same name. It has now become a tourist attraction with numerous establishments located in former cannery buildings, including Cannery Row Antique Mall which is located in the most historically intact cannery building open to the public. Other historical buildings in this district include Wing Chong Market, The American Tin Cannery which is a shopping mall, Doc Rickett's lab, next door to the aquarium and only open to the public a few times a year, and some of the water tanks written about by Steinbeck. A few privately owned and operated fishing companies still exist on Cannery Row, housed on piers located a short distance from the historic district frequented by tourists. Cannery Row is now considered the historic cannery district from Foam St. to the ocean.

The Governor Juan Bautista Alvarado House is California Historical Landmark number #348. The adobe house was seriously damaged in January, 2023, during the 2022–2023 California floods.

Lake El Estero is a popular Monterey park. Recreation opportunities include paddle boats, the Dennis the Menace Park (named after the comics character Dennis the Menace), and a skate park designed by local skaters. Birders are especially fond of this park due to its easy accessibility and the diversity of birdlife it attracts.

The city government's Recreation and Community Services department runs the Monterey Sports Center.

Religion 
The headquarters of the Roman Catholic Diocese of Monterey in California is in Monterey, and one of the relatively few Oratorian communities in the United States is located in the city. The city is adjacent to the historic Catholic Carmel Mission.

Sports
The Monterey Amberjacks are a professional baseball team that competes in the independent Pecos League which is not affiliated with Major League Baseball or Minor League Baseball. They play their home games at Sollecito Ballpark.

The Monterey Bay Derby Dames is a non-profit, amateur flat track roller derby league created by skaters for skaters in Monterey County, California. They are a member of the Women's Flat Track Derby Association.

Monterey Bay FC is an expansion team for the USL Championship league, the 2nd division of professional soccer in the US, to start play in March 2022 at Cardinale Stadium in Seaside, California. The head coach is Frank Yallop.

Government

Municipal government 
Monterey is governed by a mayor and four city council members, all elected by the public.

As of December 2019, the mayor is Clyde Roberson and the city council members are Dan Albert Jr., Alan Haffa, Ed Smith, and Tyller Williamson.

The City of Monterey provides base maintenance support services for the Presidio of Monterey and the Naval Postgraduate School, including streets, parks, and building maintenance. Additional support services include traffic engineering, inspections, construction engineering and project management. This innovative partnership has become known as the "Monterey Model" and is now being adopted by communities across the country. This service reduces maintenance costs by millions of dollars and supports a continued military presence in Monterey.

County, state, and federal representatives 

Monterey is represented on the Monterey County Board of Supervisors by Supervisor Mary Adams.

Media 

Local radio stations include KPIG-FM 107.5, KAZU-FM – 90.3 KDON-FM – 102.5, KCDU-FM – 101.7, KWAV-FM – 96.9, KDFG-FM – 103.9, KSUR – 630 AM, KMBY – 1240 AM, KRML 94.7 FM jazz, and 1610-AM the city information station. Television service for the community comes from the Monterey-Salinas-Santa Cruz designated market area (DMA). Local newspapers include the Monterey County Herald and the Monterey County Weekly.

Infrastructure

Transportation 
The city is serviced by California State Route 1, also known as the Cabrillo Highway, as it runs along the coastline of the rest of Monterey Bay to the north and Big Sur to the south. California State Route 68, also known as the Monterey-Salinas Highway, connects the city to U.S. Route 101 at Salinas and to Pacific Grove.

Local bus service is provided by Monterey-Salinas Transit.

Monterey Regional Airport connects the city to the large metropolitan areas in California, Arizona, Colorado, and Nevada.

Monterey train station was served until 1971, when Amtrak took over intercity train service and the Del Monte was discontinued.

Education 

There are several institutions of higher education in the area: the Defense Language Institute, located on the Presidio of Monterey, California; the Naval Postgraduate School, on the site of a former resort hotel; the Middlebury Institute of International Studies at Monterey (a graduate school of Middlebury College); and Monterey Peninsula College, part of the California Community Colleges system. The federal institutions (the Defense Language Institute (DLI) and the Naval Postgraduate School (NPS)) are important employers in and strongly associated with the city.

California State University, Monterey Bay and the Monterey College of Law are located at the site of the former Fort Ord in neighboring Seaside. CSU Monterey Bay has developed several programs in marine and watershed sciences.

The Monterey Peninsula Unified School District operates a high school, a middle school and three elementary schools. Private schools include Santa Catalina School (girls, co-ed elementary and middle school) and Trinity Christian High School (co-ed).

Notable people 
 Mike Aldrete, major league baseball player (1986–96); coach, St. Louis Cardinals
 Gina Aliotti, IFBB professional figure champion
 John Whitby Allen, model railroader
 Paul Anka, singer, songwriter
 Bruce Ariss, artist 
 Jean Arthur, actress
 Art Bell, resident in the 1970s
 Tory Belleci, MythBusters presenter
 Josh Billings (pen name of Henry Wheeler Shaw), second most famous humorist (after Mark Twain) of the mid-to-late 19th century; died at Monterey
 Lisa Bruce, film producer
 Beverly Cleary, author
 Walter Colton (1797–1851), first Alcalde (mayor) of Monterey
 Juan B. R. Cooper, rancher, merchant, land owner, builder of the Cooper-Molera Adobe
 Claude Crabb pro football player 1962 – 1968
 Nick Cunningham, Team USA bobsledder; 2010–2014 Winter Olympian (2-Man & 4-Man)
 Peter J. Cutino, educator and head coach of University of California, Berkeley, water polo program
 Salvador Dalí, artist; had a studio in the 1940s on the present-day Santa Catalina School grounds
 Doris Day (1922–2019), actress, singer.
 Olin Dutra, 1934 U.S. Open golf champion
 Clint Eastwood, film actor, Oscar-winning director, and producer
 Darcie Edgemon, children's author
 Herman Edwards, NFL player for Philadelphia Eagles (1977–1986); head coach with New York Jets (2001–2005) and Kansas City Chiefs (2006–2009); TV commentator
 Abe Espinosa, professional golfer, winner of Western Open
 Chris Feigenbaum, Puerto Rican international soccer player
 Joan Fontaine, Oscar-winning actress, Rebecca, Suspicion
 John W. Frost, professional tennis player
 Percy Gray, artist, early California impressionist
 Harry Ashland Greene, businessman and philanthropist
 Richard Hamming, mathematician whose work influenced computer science and telecommunications
 Lou Henry Hoover (1874–1944), wife of U.S. President Herbert Hoover; First Lady of the United States, 1929–33
 Pete Incaviglia, major league baseball player (1986–98); manager, Grand Prairie AirHogs (minor league baseball)
 Ron Johnson, American football player
 Christopher Kasparek, author, translator, physician
 Edward Kennedy, journalist
 Gary Kildall (1942–1994), founder of Digital Research, designer of the CP/M operating system, and teacher at the Naval Postgraduate School; lived in Pacific Grove and later Pebble Beach
 Major General Walter E. Lauer (1893–1966), served in World War I and II, commanded 99th Infantry Division in the Battle of the Bulge
 Henry Littlefield, author, historian, former headmaster of the York School
 Sondra Locke (1944–2018), Oscar-nominated actress, director
 James Lofton, football player for Green Bay Packers, Los Angeles Raiders, Buffalo Bills, Los Angeles Rams, and Philadelphia Eagles; member of Pro Football Hall of Fame
 Jack London, author
 Katerina Moutsatsou, Greek actress
 Michael Nesmith, member of the band The Monkees, songwriter
 Kim Novak, actress
 Leon Panetta, Congressman (1977–93); White House Chief of Staff (1994–97); Director of the Central Intelligence Agency (2009–2011);   Secretary of Defense (2011–2013)
 Wayne Rainey, three-time 500 cc Grand Prix champion (1990, 1991, 1992)
 Ed Ricketts (1897–1948), marine biologist, pioneer ecologist, influence on John Steinbeck and Joseph Campbell
 Moqut Ruffins, American football player
 Allison Scagliotti, actress
 Charles R. Schwab, businessman
 Jean Bruce Scott, actress
 Vera Steadman, actress
 John Steinbeck, Nobel Prize-winning author of The Grapes of Wrath and Of Mice and Men
 Robert Louis Stevenson, Scottish author of The Strange Case of Dr Jekyll and Mr Hyde and Treasure Island; stayed in Monterey, 1879
 Jeremy Sumpter, actor
 Edward Weston, photographer
 Frank Zappa, musician

Sister cities

Monterey is twinned with:
Dubrovnik, Croatia (2006)
Isola delle Femmine, Italy (2017)
Cervia, Italy (2014)
Kuşadası, Turkey (2007)
Lankaran, Azerbaijan (2011)
Lleida, Spain (1980)
Nanao, Japan (1995)

See also 

 Coastal California
 "Monterey", a famous song by Eric Burdon & The Animals
 Hula's Island Grill
 Montrio Bistro
 macOS Monterey

References

Works cited

Further reading 

 Augusta Fink, Monterey: The Presence of the Past, Chronicle Books, San Francisco, California (1972) 
 California State Waters Map Series—Offshore of Monterey, California, U.S. Geological Survey (2015)
 City of Monterey Parks and Recreation Master Plan, City of Monterey Parks and Recreation Department (1986)
 * 
 Environmental Hazards Element, city of Monterey, A part of the General Plan, February 1977
 Flora and Fauna Resources: City of Monterey General Plan Technical Study, prepared for City of Monterey by Bainbridge Behrens Moore Inc., November 2, 1977
 General Plan, the City of Monterey, (1980)
 Helen Spangenberg, Yesterday's Artists of the Monterey Peninsula, Monterey museum of Art (1976)
 Prehistoric Sources Technical Study, prepared for the city of Monterey by Bainbridge Behrens Moore Inc., May 23, 1977

External links 

 
 

 
Cities in Monterey County, California
Monterey Bay
Populated coastal places in California
Former colonial and territorial capitals in the United States
California
Populated places established in 1770
1770 in Alta California
1770 establishments in Alta California
Populated places established in 1890
1890 establishments in California
Incorporated cities and towns in California